Ammonium formate, NH4HCO2, is the ammonium salt of formic acid. It is a colorless, hygroscopic, crystalline solid.

Reductive amination
Acetone can be transformed into isopropylamine as follows:

CH3C(O)CH3 + 2 HCO2− +NH4 → (CH3)2CHNHCHO + 2 H2O + NH3 + CO2
(CH3)2CHNHCHO + H2O → (CH3)2CHNH2 + HCO2H

Uses
Pure ammonium formate decomposes into formamide and water when heated, and this is its primary use in industry. Formic acid can also be obtained by reacting ammonium formate with a dilute acid, and since ammonium formate is also produced from formic acid, it can serve as a way of storing formic acid.

Ammonium formate can also be used in palladium on carbon (Pd/C) reduction of functional groups. In the presence of Pd/C, ammonium formate decomposes to hydrogen, carbon dioxide, and ammonia. This hydrogen gas is adsorbed onto the surface of the palladium metal, where it can react with various functional groups. For example, alkenes can be reduced to alkanes, formaldehyde to methanol, and nitro compounds to amines. Activated single bonds to heteroatoms can also be replaced by hydrogens (hydrogenolysis).

Ammonium formate can be used for reductive amination of aldehydes and ketones (Leuckart reaction), by the following reaction:

Ammonium formate can be used as a mobile phase additive in high performance liquid chromatography (HPLC), and is suitable for use with liquid chromatography-mass spectrometry (LC/MS). The pKa values of formic acid and the ammonium ion are 3.8 and 9.2, respectively.

Reactions
When heated, ammonium formate eliminates water, forming formamide. Upon further heating, it forms hydrogen cyanide (HCN) and water. A side reaction of this is the decomposition of formamide to carbon monoxide (CO) and ammonia.

References

External links

Formates
Ammonium compounds